The Open Switch is a 1925 American silent Western film directed by J. P. McGowan and starring Helen Holmes, Jack Perrin, and Slim Whitaker.

Cast
 Helen Holmes as Helen Waters 
 Jack Perrin as Jack Strong 
 Slim Whitaker as Jim McGuire 
 Max Asher as Tim Gerraghty 
 Mack V. Wright as Daniel Lonergan 
 Henry Roquemore as George Waters 
 Arthur Millett
 J. Carrol Naish

References

Bibliography
 Munden, Kenneth White. The American Film Institute Catalog of Motion Pictures Produced in the United States, Part 1. University of California Press, 1997.

External links
 
  (preview)

1925 films
1925 Western (genre) films
1920s English-language films
Films directed by J. P. McGowan
Rayart Pictures films
Silent American Western (genre) films
1920s American films